Pitango VC, established in 1993, is Israel's largest venture capital fund with over $2.8 billion under management.  Pitango VC invests through three dedicated funds, Pitango First (early-stage investments), Pitango HealthTech (HealthTech investments), and Pitango Growth (growth investments). Pitango invests in startups around the world, in domains such as Vertical SaaS, Digital Health, Deep Tech, FinTech & InsureTech, Devops, Generative AI, Web3, and FoodTech.

With two offices in Israel (Herzliya and Sarona), Pitango currently manages several venture funds totaling over $2.8 Billion in committed capital. It has invested in more than 250 companies. The firm's investors include Time Warner, Citigroup, Eastman Kodak, Deutsche Bank and HarbourVest Partners.

History
The fund was founded as Polaris Venture Capital in 1993 by Rami Kalish, as part of a government initiative named the Yozma program ("Initiative" in Hebrew); which offered attractive tax incentives to any foreign venture-capital investments in Israel and offered to double any investment with funds from the government.

In 1996, Kalish was joined by Chemi Peres, son of former Israeli president Shimon Peres, to create Polaris Fund II, which raised more than $100 million. Polaris II invested in 35 high-tech companies. Some were partially funded by another Israeli VC firm, Eucalyptus Ventures. When the investments proved successful, Polaris II and Eucalyptus merged into Fund III in early 2000.

In 2001, Polaris Venture Capital changed its name to Pitango Venture Capital, to avoid confusion with Boston based Polaris Venture Partners. Although the Boston firm was founded in 1996, which was after Pitango was founded, the Israeli firm decided to change its name. Pitango takes its name from the semi-wild Surinam Cherry that grows in Israel.

Pitango Venture Capital Fund IV followed in 2004, and in 2007, Pitango V.

In 2010, with the support of the Israeli government, Pitango established the first fund in the country focused on investment in the Arab-Israeli sector, called Al-Bawader (Arabic for “early signs”).

Notable companies

 AppsFlyer
 Duda
 EarlySense
 eToro
 Evolven
 Formlabs
 Graphcore
 Kaminario
 mySupermarket
 Radwin
 Riskified
 Silk platform
 Taboola
 Varonis Systems
 Via Transportation, Inc.
 Zerto

Exits

References

External links

Venture capital firms of Israel
Privately held companies of Israel
Investment companies of Israel